Michelle Richardson is a fictional character in both the teen drama British series and U.S. remake of Skins. She is played by April Pearson in the British version and by Rachel Thevenard in the American version.

Characterisation
Michelle is portrayed initially as primarily interested in serving her boyfriend Tony Stonem's needs and in "looking shaggable" which she places as her primary function, compared with Jal Fazer's interest in the clarinet. She is very confident in her appearance; on the Skins website in a Myspace-style "about me" section, she protests that her photos have not been Photoshopped, and that she is "this gorgeous in real life". She is well aware that Tony's friend, Sid is in love with her, and sometimes wonders if he would be a better boyfriend than Tony. She is often angry at Tony for him calling her "nips" in reference to her nipples, and protesting that her breasts are uneven.

Despite lack of academic interest, she is very talented with languages. It is stated that she is very skilled with languages and seems to be fluent in French and Spanish. Also, in the first episode of Series One, she seems to understand Italian when it is spoken near her. It is also hinted in the last episode of series 2 that her oldest/longest known friend is Chris Miles when she says she first met him when she was 7. However, on the Skins website she states that she and her best friend Jal have been in the same class since they were 4.

On Michelle's MySpace page she says that her favourite musicians are Stevie Nicks, Peaches and Eminem, but she doesn't like Keane and James Blunt. Her favourite films are Mean Girls, The Emperor's New Groove and The Last Seduction, and her favourite television series are One Tree Hill, Scrubs and Extreme Makeover; stating the latter brings her to tears.

Michelle was one of the original characters from Jamie Brittain's original concept for the series. He has stated in an interview that her name was originally Annie. She, Sid and Tony were the characters in Brittain's novel he wrote as a teenager, but never finished. Jamie Brittain has said that while his original story line wasn't strong enough, he believed the characters were strong enough to carry in a television series.

Character history

Series 1
In the first episode Michelle has convinced one of her best friends, Cassie Ainsworth, to take friend Sid's virginity, at her boyfriend Tony's request. In "Jal" she starts to worry about Tony's interest in posh girl Abigail Stock, and in "Chris", she laments that she feels Tony who she loves will never love her in the way Sid does. In "Sid", as an experiment, Tony kisses Abigail at a concert before Michelle's eyes to prompt her to angrily break up with him, especially when she "catches" him fondling Abigail backstage. After a brief run in with some chav girls where she's assaulted, emotional and upset, she tells Sid she believes he was in on her humiliation and becomes angry with him as well. Tony urges Sid to try to score with Michelle on the rebound, and just as Michelle appears to find comfort in him, Tony appears and forces Sid to watch as he takes Michelle back instantly, affirming his power over them both.

In "Maxxie and Anwar", she and her best friend Jal attempt to reconnect while on a school trip in Russia, going out to a bar and getting incredibly drunk. Believing she is passed out, Tony attempts to seduce Maxxie Oliver although Michelle is in the same room. However, she is completely conscious, and witnesses everything up until Maxxie abruptly stops, just before Tony tries to go further sexually. The next day on the plane home, Michelle doesn't confront Tony immediately, but rather tries to get him to tell her first by subtly probing him, but he fails to confess.

Michelle finally breaks up with Tony at the start of the next episode "Michelle". When Jal questions if Tony cheated "again", Michelle is hurt when she finds out that Jal has known about Tony's past infidelity (which includes Abigail, who Tony promised he never cheated with), and has never told her. Maxxie also comes to Michelle, where he apologises and begs her not to tell anybody what had happened in Russia. Although Michelle becomes depressed and even gets caught by Angie drinking in the school supply room, she is adamant about not seeing Tony, and has been ignoring his pursuits to get her back. Meanwhile, at home she is becoming hugely annoyed with her mother's latest husband, Malcolm, feeling that he uses her mother, in addition to his rude habits.

At school, she gets the chance to confront Abigail, and is introduced to Abi's brother, Josh. Tony later tries to talk to Michelle, and she asks him to "prove" that he loves her completely, but he is unconvincing. Michelle then turns to Sid on the rebound, as she is well aware that he has been in love with her for many years. She discovers that Sid, surprisingly, has come to love her as just a friend, so she takes him to see Cassie — Sid's true love — who has gone back into rehab after a suicide attempt. At the rehab clinic, she bumps into Josh once again, who asks her out on a date.

Michelle finds that she genuinely enjoys her time with Josh, and is able to have an equal conversation with him, unlike Tony who she describes as difficult to talk to. She learns that Josh's mother, a psychiatrist, medicates him, but otherwise their relationship progresses nicely. Meanwhile, Tony has been spying on her, and eventually sabotages her and Josh's developing relationship by sending lurid pictures of Abigail from Josh's phone to Michelle. Michelle finds comfort with Jal, but is both distraught and disgusted with Josh—figuring the photos were related to his mental illness. Later, after helping to repair her mother and stepfather's hollow relationship, Tony makes another futile attempt to regain Michelle as his girlfriend, in spite of a slightly better attempt to explain that he loves her—however Michelle rejects him.

In the series finale, Michelle briefly visits Tony's sister Effy Stonem, who was just recently involved in an incident orchestrated by Josh to get back at Tony for the events in the episode "Michelle". Although Effy doesn't speak, Michelle asks her why Tony hurt her, but Effy genuinely doesn't know. Michelle shows Effy some affection before leaving. Later in the episode Michelle attends with Jal to friend Anwar Kharral's 17th birthday party. Tony comes as well, along with Effy, but neither of them actually go inside. Effy calls Tony a "wanker" for hurting Michelle, and he finally calls her on his phone to confess his love to her. Michelle listens to the phone while crying, and just as Tony crosses the street, he is hit by a bus. Michelle can be seen calling presumably an ambulance at the end of the episode.

Series 2
In the second series, it is learned that Michelle has had no contact with Tony during the six months after his accident. Instead she has been drinking at bars, flirting with men, and presumably having sex as well. It is clear that she is confused how to approach the situation with Tony, although she is quite aware that what she has been doing is wrong. In addition to her problems with Tony, her relationship with Sid is strained, an example of this being seen when Sid catches Michelle dancing with two guys and snogging at a club, to which she runs away guilty and humiliated having been seen. Later in the episode, through an emotional confession to Sid, we learn that Michelle has gone to see Tony only once since the accident.

School eventually resumes and Michelle is now in her final year of college. In an Unseen Skins episode, Maxxie encourages Michelle to sign up for the school play (Osama! The Musical). Although Michelle declines because of stage fright, she eventually auditions where she shows she has an aptitude for singing, and eventually gets the lead role alongside Maxxie. During a kissing scene during rehearsal between Maxxie, Sketch – Maxxie's stalker – puts Michelle's life into danger when she purposely drops a heavy stage light out of jealousy.

Later at a costume fund-raising party for drama, Michelle wears a costume modeled on Princess Leia, only to be insulted by Abigail, who is also dressed as Leia. To make matters worse she came to the party with Tony, who is dressed as Luke Skywalker. Michelle is hurt that Tony dressed "for" Abigail, although Tony is unclear himself of the circumstances of his costume, let alone his relationship with Abigail. Michelle takes Tony into a private area where she confronts Tony as to why he took Abigail to the party. We learn that Abigail has been convincing Tony that she is his girlfriend, not Michelle. After both a failed attempt at seducing Tony and being deeply hurt that Tony doesn't remember her, Michelle comes to realisation that Tony isn't the same person anymore.

When word gets around that Sketch was assaulted by their Drama teacher, Bruce—a false story made up by Sketch—Michelle shows kindness and compassion when she attempts to befriend her and invites her to sit with her during lunch. Michelle learns Sketch's true nature only when she gives her pills that make her sick, causing her to drop out of the school play just moments before the show (and subsequently fulfilling the role).

In episode 4 Michelle once again asks Tony how much he remembers, however he doesn't remember much if anything about their relationship at all. When Michelle tries to seduce Tony, Tony has developed an erectile dysfunction, which frustrates Michelle and prompts her to slap him, blaming him for his accident and subsequent condition. Although she apologises, she tells Tony she cannot wait for him and the two officially end their relationship. Before leaving Tony gives her an early birthday gift, and Michelle invites him along on her birthday camping trip, to which he declines.

Meanwhile, we learn that her mother has ended her relationship with Malcolm, and has recently married one of her clients, Ted. They have also moved in with him into his newly renovated upscale home, which Michelle dislikes greatly. To make matters worse, Ted has a spoiled daughter named Scarlett—who are alarmingly too close for comfort for Michelle—who decides she'd move in as well.

At school, Scarlett wins Michelle's friends over with her charm and sex appeal. When she invites herself on the camping trip, offering the use of her car, Michelle feels annoyed. On the trip she feels alone and irritated with Scarlett's presence there, and finds comfort from both Sid and Maxxie. Later that night she catches Scarlett trying to seduce Sid, and finally decides to confront her. However she learns that Scarlett isn't as much of a bad person as she pretends to be, and goes after Sid instead.

In an intense moment, Sid expresses his grief to Michelle over his recently deceased father, and the two of them kiss and make love for the first time with each other on the beach. They decide to keep their relationship private, feeling that they're not ready to tell their friends, and preferring to spend more time with each other. However, after returning to Sid's home where they passionately attempt to have sex in Sid's bedroom, they're interrupted by Sid's girlfriend Cassie, who has been watching the entire time from Sid's bed.

Cassie blatantly announces to the gang of Michelle and Sid's new relationship, much to everyone's surprise. Tony pretends not to care, however Jal is angered that Michelle didn't tell her since she's her best friend. Michelle and Sid remain, even if apologetically, together however.

It isn't until one night at a club, at the end of the episode "Tony", Tony confronts Michelle and Sid in the bathroom stall during sex. Tony, who is finally ready, tells Michelle that they're meant to be together, opposed to her and Sid, who is meant to be with Cassie. Sid admits that he isn't in love with Michelle anymore, leaving Michelle both shocked at Sid's change of heart and Tony's sudden determination.

In "Effy", Tony spends the episode trying to reach Michelle, who is ignoring his many phone calls and text messages. It is apparent that she wants nothing to do with him, especially after he ruined her relationship, and even sends the watch he got her for her birthday back to him. However Effy gets the watch fixed, engraved with the word "forever", and sends it back to Michelle, finally softening Michelle enough to answer Tony's phone call. At the very ending of the episode, she answers the phone, with merely "I love you too" before hanging it up again.

In the next two episodes leading up to the finale we learn that Michelle and Tony are trying to take their relationship "slow" and to not "make a thing of it". She's worried about their relationship what with exams interfering, and Jal's time of need ever since the death of friend Chris, keeping them apart. Although she proclaims to still be angry about the situation, her and Tony seem genuinely happy together, if not a bit sheepish in each other's presence. Tony can be seen bringing her flowers, walking her to class, and carrying her books—their relationship is progressing.

However, in the finale of the series, Michelle receives her A-levels: 2 As and 1 B, and she has plans to further her studies at York, whereas Tony plans on attending Cardiff. There is tension between the two as they inwardly struggle how they'll deal with their relationship, what with their plans on going to separate universities. In the last moments of the series' finale, Michelle and Tony reflect on their relationship in a private moment, leaving the audience dubious whether they're going to continue their relationship or say goodbye forever.

References

External links
 Michelle Richardson on the official E4 Skins site
 Michelle Richardson on Myspace

Skins (British TV series) characters
Fictional English people
Television characters introduced in 2007
Female characters in television
British female characters in television
Teenage characters in television

pt:Michelle Richardson